Udriku is a village in Kadrina Parish, Lääne-Viru County, northeastern Estonia, where the Udriku manor, a national architectural monument built in the early nineteenth century, is situated.

Udriku manor
Udriku estate was founded in 1642 and belonged to the Baltic German Rehbinder family until the agrarian reforms following Estonia's independence in 1919. The current, neoclassical building is from 1803, and currently houses a nursing home. Some of the original interiors such as painted ceilings and plaster decorations are still preserved.

See also
Henrik von Rehbinder

References

External links

  Udriku mõis National Heritage Board, Digital Data

Villages in Lääne-Viru County
Kreis Wierland
Manor houses in Estonia